Conestoga Cork Works Building, also known as E. Rosenwald & Co. Tobacco Warehouse, Rose Bros. & Co., Farmers Supply, and Rosenwald Court Apartments, is a historic factory and tobacco warehouse located at Lancaster, Lancaster County, Pennsylvania. It was built between about 1883 and 1897, and is a three-story, 31 bay brick building with a hipped and gabled roof.  It has a stuccoed limestone foundation.  The building was used as a cork cutting factory until 1912, a tobacco warehouse until the 1960s, then converted to apartments in 1992.

It was listed on the National Register of Historic Places in 1996.

References

Industrial buildings and structures on the National Register of Historic Places in Pennsylvania
Industrial buildings completed in 1897
Buildings and structures in Lancaster, Pennsylvania
Tobacco buildings in the United States
National Register of Historic Places in Lancaster, Pennsylvania